Sunkhani is a village development committee (VDC) in Nuwakot District in the Bagmati Zone of central Nepal. At the time of the 1991 Nepal census it had a population of 2340 people living in 437 individual households.

One major attraction in Sunkhani VDC is the Shanti Dharma Stupa. This is a 15-metre high memorial tower built in the memory of all the lives that were lost in the April 2015 earthquake in Nepal. The stupa was built by a Buddhist religious group called Honmon Butsuryu Shu (HBS). The Buddhist center adjacent to the stupa is working on propagation of Buddhist ideas to promote peace, happiness and general social welfare among the population.

References

External links
UN map of the municipalities of Nuwakot District

Populated places in Nuwakot District